Bircher Common is an area of lowland heath in the civil parish of Croft and Yarpole in Herefordshire, England, and  north from Leominster. The common, owned by the National Trust, is adjacent at the west to Croft Castle, a further National Trust Property. Croft Ambrey, an Iron Age hill fort, is to the north-west within the border of the neighbouring parish of Aymestrey.

References

External links

Parks and open spaces in Herefordshire